Tauragnai is a town in Utena County, Lithuania. According to the 2011 census, the town has a population of 473 people.

Gallery

References

Towns in Lithuania
Towns in Utena County
Novoalexandrovsky Uyezd